Pamir University is a private higher education institute which was officially inaugurated on April 24, 2011, in the city of Khost, Khost Province, southeastern Afghanistan.

Pamir University has three faculties: computer science, language and literature, and economics.

References

External links 

Universities in Afghanistan
Khost Province
Educational institutions established in 2011
2011 establishments in Afghanistan
Education in Afghanistan
Khost
Private universities in Afghanistan